Hinduism in Trinidad and Tobago is the second largest religion. Hindu culture arrived to Trinidad and Tobago in 1845, with the arrival of the first Indian indentured laborers, whom an overwhelming majority of were Hindu. According to the 2011 census there were 240,100 declared Hindus in Trinidad and Tobago.

History

A decade after slavery was abolished in 1834, the British government gave permission for the colonists to import indentured labor from India to work on the estates. Throughout the remainder of the century, Trinidad's population growth came primarily from Indian laborers. By 1871, there were 27,425 Indians, approximately 22 percent of the population of Trinidad and Tobago; by 1911 that figure had grown to 110,911, or about 33 percent of all residents of the islands.

During the initial decades of Indian indenture, Indian cultural forms were met with either contempt or indifference by the non-Hindu majority. Hindus have made many contributions to Trinidad history and culture even though the state historically regarded Hindus as second class citizens. Hindus in Trinidad struggled over the granting of adult franchise, the Hindu marriage bill, the divorce bill, cremation ordinance, and others. Cremation was allowed in 1953.

There has been persistent discontent among the Hindus with their marginalization. Many groups portray Hindus as "clannish, backward and miserly". During the General Elections of 1986, the absence of the Bhagvad Gita and the Quran at polling stations for required oath-taking was interpreted as a gross insult to Hindus and Muslims. The absence of any Hindu religious texts at the official residence of the President of Trinidad and Tobago during the swearing in of the new Government in 1986 was perceived as another insult to the minority communities since they were represented in the government. The national education system and curriculum have been repeatedly accused of such majority-oriented symbolism. The use of discernibly oriented prayers at Government schools, the non-representation of Hinduism in approved school textbooks, and the lack of emphasis on Hindu religious observance evoked deep resentment from the Hindu community. Intensified protests over the course of the 1980s led to an improvement in the state's attitudes towards Hindus.

The divergence of some of the fundamental aspects of local Hindu culture, the segregation of the Hindu community from Trinidad, and the disinclination to risk erasing the more fundamental aspects of what had been constructed as "Trinidad Hinduism" in which the identity of the group had been rooted, would often generate dissension when certain dimensions of Hindu culture came into contact with the State. While the incongruousness continue to generate debate, and often conflict, it is now tempered with growing awareness and consideration on the part of the state to the Hindu minority. Hindus have been also been subjected to conversions by Christian missionaries, specifically the evangelical and Pentecostal Christians. Such activities reflect racial tensions that at times arise between the Afro-Trinidadian and Indo-Trinidadian communities.

Demographics

As per the 2011 Census, there were 240,100 Hindus in Trinidad and Tobago. Out of this, 232,104 were Indian, 2,738 were Dougla (mixed African/Indian),  2,466 were Mixed/Other,  1,887 Unknown ethnicity, 346 African, 175 Chinese, 27 European, 302 Indigenous Amerindian, 46 Other, and 8 Portuguese. Talking about the proportion within the ethnic groups, 49.54% of the East Indians and 21.66% of the Indigenous were Hindu. So were 4.37% of the Chinese, 2.70% of Douglas (mixed African/East Indian), 1.23% of the Mixed/Other and 0.08% of the Africans.

Hindu population according to the administrative division is as follows: Port of Spain- 1.45%, San Fernando- 10.70%, Arima- 4.39%, Chaguanas- 30.04%, Point Fortin- 3.87%, Couva- 31.26%, Diego Martin- 1.83%, Mayaro- 22.46%, Penal- 42.98%, Princes Town- 26.99%, San Juan- 8.35%, Sangre Grande- 15.41%, Siparia-23.37%, Tunapuna- 14.07%, and Tobago- 0.67%.

Sects, denominations, and organizations

Sanātanī, the largest and most dominant Hindu sect in Trinidad and Tobago
Sanatan Dharma Maha Sabha, the major Sanātanī group in Trinidad and Tobago
SWAHA International, a smaller Sanātanī group
Arya Samaj
Arya Pratinidhi Sabha 
Vedic Mission
Kabir Panth
Ramanandi Sampradaya
Seunariani (Sieunarini/Siewnaraini/Shiv Narayani)
Aughar (Aghor/Owghur)
Ravidas Panth
Kali Mai (Madrasi)
Murugan (Kaumaram)
Chinmaya Mission
Bharat Sevashram Sangha
Sathya Sai Baba movement/Sathya Sai Organization
Shirdi Sai Baba movement
Jagadguru Kripalu Parishat (Radha Madhav)
ISKCON
Ganapathi Sachchidananda movement
Divine Life Society
Brahma Kumaris
Blue Star

Culture

Mandirs

Hindu organisations and holidays

The major Hindu organisation in Trinidad and Tobago is the Sanatan Dharma Maha Sabha founded by Bhadase Sagan Maraj, and formerly led by his son-in-law Secretary General Satnarayan Maharaj, is led by his grandson, Secretary General Vijay Maharaj. The Hindu festival of Diwali is a public holidays in Trinidad and Tobago, and along with Phagwah, it is widely celebrated in Trinidad and Tobago by people of all races, ethnicities, cultures, and religions. Others Hindu festivas such as: Ram Navami, Sita Navami, Vivaha Panchami, Maha Shivaratri, Navaratri, Chhath Puja, Krishna Janmaashtami, Radhastami, Dussehra, Kartik Purnima, Guru Purnima, Vat Pournima, Tulsi Vivah, Makar Sankranti, Ratha Saptami, Ahoi Ashtami, Pitru Paksha, Hanuman Jayanti, Ganesh Chaturthi, Raksha Bandhan, Gandhi Jayanti, Vasant Panchami, and Mesha Sankranti are also celebrated.

Caste
As in other parts of the Caribbean, South Africa, Fiji, and Mauritius, caste distinctions are all but forgotten among Trinidadian Hindus. Considerations of caste became less important in choosing a spouse largely because there were so few women among the Indian indentured workers.

Cremation
Cremation is permitted at five cremation sites in Mafeking (Mayaro-Rio Claro), South Oropouche (Siparia), Waterloo (Couva-Tabaquite-Talparo), Felicity (Chaguanas) and Caroni (Tunapuna-Piarco).

Famous Trinidadian Hindus

 Ravi Bissambhar
 Kamla Persad-Bissessar 
 Neil Bissoondath
Dole Chadee (born Nankissoon Boodram)
 Capildeo family
 Rudranath Capildeo
 Simbhoonath Capildeo
 Vahni Capildeo
 Rajindra Dhanraj
 Daren Ganga
 Rikki Jai
 Parvati Khan
 Kenneth Lalla
 Bhadase Sagan Maraj
 Krishna Nanan Maharaj
 Satnarayan Maharaj
 Valene Maharaj
 Roodal Moonilal
 Seepersad Naipaul
 Shiva Naipaul
 V.S. Naipaul
 Basdeo Panday
 Lakshmi Persaud
 Rajendra Persaud
 Sundar Popo
 Neeshan Prabhoo
 Anantanand Rambachan
 Surujrattan Rambachan
 Drupatee Ramgoonai
 Anand Ramlogan
 Heeralal Rampartap
 Adrian Cola Rienzi 
 Adesh Samaroo
 Lall Ramnath Sawh
 Sahadeo Tiwari
 Rakesh Yankaran

See also

 Indo-Caribbean
List of Hindu temples in Trinidad and Tobago
 Indo-Trinidadian and Tobagonian
 Hinduism in Suriname
 Hinduism in Guyana
 Hinduism in the West Indies

References

External links 

 
Indo-Caribbean religion
Indo-Trinidadian and Tobagonian culture